Iso Camartin (born 24 March 1944 in Chur) is a Swiss author, publicist and anchorman.

Selected works
Kants Schematismuslehre und ihre Transformation beim frühen Fichte. Zur Ausformung des Identitätsdenkens. Dissertation, Regensburg 1971
Nichts als Worte? Ein Plädoyer für Kleinsprachen. Artemis, Zürich 1985
Lob der Verführung. Essays über die Nachgiebigkeit. Artemis, Zürich 1987
Karambolagen. Geschichten und Glossen. Artemis, Zürich 1990
Von Sils-Maria aus betrachtet. Ausblicke vom Dach Europas. Suhrkamp, Frankfurt am Main 1991
Die Bibliothek von Pila. Suhrkamp, Frankfurt am Main 1994
Nelke und Caruso. Über Hunde. Eine Romanze (mit Verena Aufferman). Berlin Verlag, Berlin 1997
Der Teufel auf der Säule. 52 Flash-Geschichten. Suhrkamp, Frankfurt am Main 1998
Graziendienst. Suhrkamp, Frankfurt am Main 1999
Hinauslehnen. Geschichten, Glossen. Suhrkamp, Frankfurt am Main 2000
Jeder braucht seinen Süden. Suhrkamp, Frankfurt am Main 2003
Belvedere. Das schöne Fernsehen. Suhrkamp, Frankfurt am Main 2005
Bin ich Europäer? Eine Tauglichkeitsprüfung. C. H. Beck, München 2006
Die Geschichten des Herrn Casparis. C. H. Beck, München 2008
Schweiz (Reihe Die Deutschen und ihre Nachbarn). C. H. Beck, München 2008

Awards
1986 Prix européen de l'essai Charles Veillon 
1988 Conrad-Ferdinand-Meyer-Preis
1997 Prix Lipp littéraire
1998 Johann-Heinrich-Merck-Preis

External links
 
 
Portrait bei lyrikwelt.de

1944 births
People from Chur
Swiss non-fiction writers
Swiss male writers
Swiss writers in German
Swiss television presenters
Academic staff of the University of Zurich
Academic staff of ETH Zurich
Living people
Swiss television journalists
Male non-fiction writers